A by-election was held for the New South Wales Legislative Assembly electorate of Orange on 25 May 1996 following the retirement of sitting member, Garry West.

On the same day, by-elections were held in the seats of Clarence, Pittwater, Southern Highlands and Strathfield.

All seats were retained by the Liberal-National Parties, with the exception of Clarence. In Orange, the National Party suffered a swing of 13.82% against it on a two-party preferred basis.

Dates

Results

Garry West retired.

References 

1996 elections in Australia
New South Wales state by-elections
1990s in New South Wales